Ishgeh Su (also Romanized as Īshgeh Sū; also known as Ashkeh Sū) is a village in Beradust Rural District, Sumay-ye Beradust District, Urmia County, West Azerbaijan Province, Iran. At the 2006 census, its population was 126, in 18 families.

References 

Populated places in Urmia County